Sarıtaş is a village in the Yüksekova District of Hakkâri Province in Turkey. The village is populated by Kurds of the Ertoşî and Mamxuran tribes and had a population of 598 in 2021.

The hamlet of Yemişli is attached to it.

References 

Villages in Yüksekova District
Kurdish settlements in Hakkâri Province